Quintessential Ephemera is fifth full-length album by post-metal band Rosetta and their first recording as a five-piece.

In stark contrast to the darker hardcore influenced sound of The Anaesthete, Quintessential Ephemera saw Rosetta moving into more upbeat and melodic territory, with greater use of clean vocals by Eric Jernigan as well as David Grossman. The addition of Jernigan as a second guitarist also saw the band experiment more with counterpoint guitar melodies. Matt Weed has frequently cited Oceansize as a major influence on the direction of Quintessential Ephemera.

Track listing

Personnel
 Mike Armine - vocals, electronics
 Dave Grossman - bass, vocals
 Eric Jernigan - guitar, vocals
 B.J. McMurtrie - drums, vocals, 
 Matt Weed - guitar, piano, vocals

References

2015 albums
Rosetta (band) albums
Self-released albums